John Houlding (born 1 June 1962) is a Canadian rower. He competed at the 1984 Summer Olympics and the 1988 Summer Olympics.

References

External links
 

1962 births
Living people
Canadian male rowers
Olympic rowers of Canada
Rowers at the 1984 Summer Olympics
Rowers at the 1988 Summer Olympics
Rowers from Montreal
Pan American Games medalists in rowing
Pan American Games bronze medalists for Canada
Rowers at the 1983 Pan American Games
20th-century Canadian people